The 1985 African U-16 Qualifying for World Cup was the first qualifying edition organized by the Confederation of African Football (CAF) into the FIFA U-16 World Championship. The three winners qualified to the 1985 FIFA U-16 World Championship.

First round
The winners advanced to the Second Round.

|}

Guinea qualified after 3−1 on aggregate.

Zambia qualified after 4−2 on aggregate.

Second round
The winners qualified for the 1985 FIFA U-16 World Championship.

|}

Nigeria qualified after 2−1 on aggregate.

Guinea qualified after 2−1 on aggregate.

Congo qualified on penalties free kick 4–2 after a draw of 2–2 on aggregate.

Countries to participate in 1985 FIFA U-16 World Championship
The 3 teams which qualified for 1985 FIFA U-16 World Championship.

External links
Details qualifying - rsssf.com

1985 in African football
African U-16 Qualifying for World Cup